Goffredo D'Andrea was an Italian film actor who appeared mainly during the silent era. He also worked occasionally as a screenwriter and film director.

Selected filmography
 Castigo (1917)
 La principessa di Bagdad (1918)
 Vicenzella (1923)
 Napule ca se ne và (1926)
 Star of the Sea (1928)
 Assunta Spina (1930)
 Fiocca la neve (1931)
 Two Hearts Among the Beasts (1943)
 Guarany (1948)

References

Bibliography
 Goble, Alan. The Complete Index to Literary Sources in Film. Walter de Gruyter, 1999.

External links

Year of birth unknown
Year of death unknown
Italian male film actors
Italian male silent film actors
20th-century Italian male actors
Italian film directors